Orus W. Jones (March 8, 1867 – August 10, 1963) was an American golfer who competed in the 1904 Summer Olympics. He was born in Jackson, Ohio. In 1904, he was part of the American team which won the bronze medal. In the individual competition, he finished 19th in the qualification round and was eliminated in the first round of the match play.

References

External links
Orus Jones' profile at databaseOlympics
Orus Jones' profile at Sports Reference.com

American male golfers
Amateur golfers
Golfers at the 1904 Summer Olympics
Olympic bronze medalists for the United States in golf
Medalists at the 1904 Summer Olympics
Golfers from Ohio
People from Jackson, Ohio
1867 births
1963 deaths